John A. Lentz House is a historic home located at Hickory, Catawba County, North Carolina. It was built in 1890, and is a two-story, three bay, frame dwelling with Classical Revival style design elements.  It features a full-length, two-level front porch with Tuscan Doric order columns.  It has a two-story rear ell and one-story wing.  It was the home of John A. Lentz (1860-1925), who served as Hickory's mayor in 1911–1912.

It was listed on the National Register of Historic Places in 1985.

References

Hickory, North Carolina
Houses on the National Register of Historic Places in North Carolina
Neoclassical architecture in North Carolina
Houses completed in 1890
Houses in Catawba County, North Carolina
National Register of Historic Places in Catawba County, North Carolina